Jose Vicente D. Mapa III, who is better known by his screen name Jao Mapa (born February 11, 1976), is a Filipino actor from the Philippines. He is also an accomplished painter.

Acting career
Mapa is best known for his Pepsi-Cola advertisement. He started a modeling career in the late 1990s, and co-hosted television variety shows like Eat Bulaga and ASAP. He first starred in the movie 'Pare Ko' in 1995, and left showbusiness in 2000 to study art. Jao is expected to be back on television screen via Sine Novela:Trudis Liit aired on GMA Network.

Painting career
In 2000, took a break from his showbiz career and went back to school to earn his degree in Fine Arts (major in Advertising) at the University of Santo Tomas. He graduated in 2003 and continued to paint.  He had his first major show at Grey Gallery in Antipolo, Rizal in 2012.

Portrayals in media 
Mapa's life story was feature in TV5's Star Confessions, was portrayed by Martin Escudero.

Personal life
He graduated at the University of Santo Tomas with a degree in Fine arts, majoring in advertising. His younger brother, Diego Mapa, is also a known musician and plays for the bands Monsterbot, Pedicab and Cambio. He is married to Cecille and has three children, namely, Benjamin, Caleb and Amber Marie.

Paintings

Pamilya
Basurero
Inuman
Jusinera
Minotour
Umaga
Labandera 
Pista

Filmography

Film
 Pagpag: Larawang Kupas (2017)
 Fruits N' Vegetables: Mga Bulakboleros (2016) as University Security Guard
 Bumulakabataan...Bulalakaw Waves (2016) as Waiter at Bar
 Vampires' Transformation: #UsapangVampire na 'yan! (2016, Short Films) as Waiter at Resort
 Manila's Finest (2015)
 FPJ's Ang Probinsyano (2015)
 Kamandag ni Venus (2014)
 Sa Ngalan Ng Ama, Ina At Mga Anak (2014)
 Isang Araw (2013)
 Jumbo Jericho (2013)
 Guerilla Is A Poet (2013)
 Larong Bata (2012)
 Limang Dipang Tao (2012) as Chester
 Balang Araw (2012)
 Pacer 3 (2012, TV Movie) 
 Tumbok (2011) ....Benjie
 Pilantik (2010)
 Hungkag (2010, Short Films) as Caloy
 HIV: Si Heidi, Si Ivy at Si V (2010)
 Working Girls (2010) as Leon Arnaldo 
 Donor (2010)
 Luna Lucis (2009, Short Films) as Joaquin
 69 1/2 (2009) as Wiley Kamote
 Bala Bala: Maniwala ka (2009)
 Fidel (2009) as Goonie
 I Love Dreamguyz (2009) as Didi
 Pasang krus (2009)
 Medalya (2009) as Efren
 Miss Taken (2008) (V) as Bryan
 Baler (2008) as Mauro
 Huling Pasada (2008)
 Dollhouse (2008) as Red ..Lihim ng Dapit Hapon (2008, Letran Short Films) ....
 Condo (2008) as Ricky
 Sisa (2008) as Crisostomo Ibarra
 Motorcycle (2008) as Romus
 Ay ayeng (2008)
 Xerox Copy (2007)
 Super Noypi (2006)
 You Are the One (2006) .... Venjamin Garcia
 Illusyon (2005) as Artist
 Cut (2005/II)
 Tunay na mahal (2000)
 Tugatog (2000) as Jake
 A Date with Jao Mapa (1999) (V) .... Jao Mapa
 Babae (1997) as Victor
 Matrikula (1997) as Eddie Boy
 Dahil tanging ikaw (1997)
 Asero (1995) as Troy
 Hataw na! (1995) as Nico Torres
 Pare ko (1995) as Chipper
 Maalaala Mo Kaya: The Movie (1994) as Jerry
 Nag-iisang Bituin (1994)
Paraluman (2021)

Television

See also
Tau Gamma Phi, for their Notable Alumni.

References

External links

Labandera painting on PEP 

1976 births
Filipino male child actors
Star Magic
Filipino painters
Filipino male television actors
Living people
University of Santo Tomas alumni
ABS-CBN personalities
GMA Network personalities
Filipino male film actors